Byford is a village and civil parish on the River Wye in Herefordshire, England, about  west of Hereford.  According to the 2001 census, it had a population of 119, increasing to 201 at the 2011 census.

Offa's Dyke runs along Garnons Hill, to the north of the village. The 11th-century church of St John the Baptist is a Grade I listed building.

References

External links

Villages in Herefordshire
Civil parishes in Herefordshire